The 1934 Miami Redskins football team was an American football team that represented Miami University as a member of the Buckeye Athletic Association (BAA) during the 1934 college football season. In its third season under head coach Frank Wilton, Miami compiled a 5–4 record (2–2 against conference opponents) and finished in third place out of five teams in the BAA.

Schedule

References

Miami
Miami RedHawks football seasons
Miami Redskins football